The 2008 South Africa rugby union tour of Europe was a series of matches played in November 2008 in Great Britain by South Africa national rugby union team.

Results

2008 rugby union tours
2008 in South African rugby union
2008
2008–09 in British rugby union
2008–09 in Welsh rugby union
2008–09 in Scottish rugby union
2008–09 in English rugby union
2008
2008
2008
2008
November 2008 sports events in the United Kingdom